Mr. Chips is a soul-jazz album by saxophonist Hank Crawford, released in 1986 on Milestone Records.

Track listing 

 "Endless Love" (Lionel Richie) 7:08
 "You Send Me" (L.C. Cooke) 6:18
 "Mr. Chips" (Crawford) 4:28 
 "Stand by Me" (Ben E. King/Jerry Leiber/Mike Stoller) 5:4
 "Let's Fall In Love All Over Again" 4:21
 "Bedtime" 8:24

Personnel 

 Hank Crawford - alto saxophone
 Leon Thomas – vocals on "You Send Me"
 David “Fathead” Newman - tenor saxophone, flute
 Howard Johnson - baritone saxophone
 Randy Brecker - trumpet
 Alan Rubin - trumpet
 Cornell Dupree - guitar
 Richard Tee - keyboards
 Wilbur Bascomb - bass 
 Bernard Purdie - drums

References 

1986 albums
Hank Crawford albums
Albums produced by Bob Porter (record producer)
Milestone Records albums